Picris hieracioides, or hawkweed oxtongue, is a species of flowering plant in the family Asteraceae.

References

Bibliography

External links
 
 Flora of New Zealand

Cichorieae
Plants described in 1753
Taxa named by Carl Linnaeus
Flora of Malta